Copland Pass is a pass at about  over Frostbite Spine, the ridge between Hooker Glacier and Salient Glacier in the Royal Society Range, Victoria Land. It was named after Copland Pass in the New Zealand Southern Alps, by R.H. Findlay, leader of a New Zealand Antarctic Research Program geological party to the area, 1981–82.

References
 

Mountain passes of Victoria Land
Scott Coast